Lynn Tan (born 24 February 1988) is a Singaporean model and beauty pageant titleholder who won Miss Universe Singapore 2012. She represented her country in the 2012 Miss Universe 2012 pageant.

Education 
Tan studied at CHIJ Saint Nicholas Girls' School for her primary and secondary school education. She also studied at Raffles Junior College.

Pageant career

Miss Singapore Universe 2012 
Tan was the winner of Miss Universe Singapore 2012 and also won three other awards, Miss Body Beautiful, Miss Lumiere International and Miss Sensational Smile.

Miss Universe 2012 
Tan represented Singapore at Miss Universe 2012 in Las Vegas, USA but was unplaced at the pageant on December 19, 2012.

Modelling career 
In 2011, Tan also won the FHM Model of the Year (Singapore) competition.

In 2012, Tan was awarded the Star Model of Singapore award at the Asian Models Festival Awards in Seoul, Korea.

Lynn was a part-time model in university and has modeled for brands such as La Perla, Softbake, Mondial Jewelry, Luxor Champagne, Ecco, Epson and Singtel.

Career
Tan previously worked in mergers and acquisitions at Deloitte & Touche.

Philanthropy
Lynn is actively engaged in philanthropy. 
Her adopted charity and cause for awareness is the Singapore Guide Dogs Association for the Blind. She raised S$33,000 for the charity with the help of Deloitte & Touche.
She was also the Ambassador for the Color Run, an international festival which supports Project Happy Feet.

Her other charitable activities include: 
ICAP Charity Day 2013 & 2014
Volunteering at the Lee Ah Mooi old age home
Conducting grooming classes for underprivileged girls

References

External links
Lynn Tan Facebook page
Official Miss Singapore Facebook

Living people
Singaporean beauty pageant winners
Singaporean people of Chinese descent
 
Raffles Junior College alumni
Miss Universe 2012 contestants
1988 births